Michelle Naka Pierce (born 1968 in Tokyo, Japan, and raised in Albuquerque, NM) is a half Japanese/half American poet. She teaches experimental poetry and writing pedagogy at Naropa University and is the director of the Jack Kerouac School of Disembodied Poetics, founded by Allen Ginsberg and Anne Waldman in 1974. Pierce is the author of four books, including Continuous Frieze Bordering [Red], awarded the Poets Out Loud Editor's Prize (Fordham University Press, forthcoming 2012).



Published works

Books 
 TRI/VIA, co-written with Veronica Corpuz (Erudite Fangs/PUB LUSH, 2003).
 Beloved Integer (Bootstrap/PUB LUSH, 2007).
 She, A Blueprint, with art by Sue Hammond West (BlazeVOX Books, 2011).
 Continuous Frieze Bordering [Red] (Fordham, forthcoming 2012).

Chapbooks 
 48 Minutes Left (Belladonna*, 2003).
 As Transient As Square Or Inside 32 (Tir Aux Pigeons, 2008).
 Symptom of Color (Dusie, 2011).

External links
 Official Site of Michelle Naka Pierce
 Naropa Faculty Page
 Interview at Tarpaulin Sky

1968 births
Living people
American women poets
American poets
American poets of Asian descent
American women writers of Asian descent
American writers of Japanese descent
21st-century American poets
21st-century American women writers